The Copa 50imo Aniversario de Clarín, was a friendly football match realized between Argentina and Brazil, on November 8, 1995.

The match was played on the occasion of the 50th. anniversary of Clarín, the largest newspapers of Argentina and the second most circulated in the Spanish-speaking world, which was also the main sponsor for the match.

This was the 80th time that Argentina and Brazil faced each other, and the first match between both teams after Brazil eliminated Argentina via penalty shoot-out at the 1995 Copa América, when forward Túlio scored a controversial goal (he used his hand to receive the pass before shooting) to tie the game on 81'. That goal forced the penalties to qualify a team to semifinals.

A second match would be played by both teams in 1997.

Match details

See also
 Argentina–Brazil football rivalry

References  

Argentina national football team matches
Brazil national football team matches
International association football matches
1995 in Brazilian football
1995 in Argentine football
Argentina–Brazil football rivalry
Football in Buenos Aires